NFLVR.com is a fantasy football and news website that focuses on the National Football League, though much of its news is aggregated from mainstream media sources.
 
The main focus of the site is to bridge the gap between NFL players and NFL fans, while providing the most accurate fantasy football expectations in the industry.
 
The site was created on July 21, 2011, by Austin D. Jordan, who is also the site's primary editor and contributor. NFLVR.com launched with a boom as Jordan created a voting poll for NFL players to be able to use in order to help reconstitute the NFL Player's Union.
 
Jordan used Twitter to reach out to NFL players in order to make them aware of the poll and to offer his services to help reconstitute the NFL Player's Union if the players, NFLPA, and NFL decided to do so.
 
On July 22, 2011, George Atallah of the NFLPA rejected using NFLVR as a way to help reconstitute the NFL Player's Union. Additionally, the NFLPA sent out a memo to all NFL players and agents to inform them they were not affiliated with NFLVR.com which prompted NFL Network, ESPN, and many other major news sources to report on NFLVR.
 
Since 2011, NFLVR has become known as one of the most accurate and trusted NFL news and fantasy football websites in the industry.
 
On August 15, 2012, NFLVR.com partnered with Google.

References

External links

American football websites